Wylie is an English name meaning "well-watered meadow", and may also refer to:

People
 Wylie (surname)
 Wylie (Australian explorer), Aboriginal companion of Edward John Eyre during his crossing of the Nullarbor Plain in Australia
 Wylie Breckenridge (1903–1991), rugby union player who represented Australia
 Wylie Gelber (born 1988), American bassist and guitar maker, founding member of the band Dawes
 Wylie Gibbs (born 1922), Australian politician
 Wylie Cameron Grant (1879–1968), American tennis champion
 Wylie Human (born 1979), South African rugby union winger
 Wylie Stateman, American supervising sound editor
 Wylie Sypher (1905–1987), American non-fiction writer and professor
 Wylie Watson (1889–1966), British actor
 Wylie G. Woodruff (1866–1930), American football player and coach

Fictional characters
 Wile E. Coyote, a cartoon character whose name sounds similar to "Wily"
 Wylie Burp, a character from the film An American Tail: Fievel Goes West
 Wylie Endal, a character from Keeper Of The Lost Cities by Shannon Messenger
Wylie Kit, and Wylie Kat : cartoon twin siblings from thundercats 1985

Places

United States
 Lake Wylie, South Carolina
 Wylie Township, Minnesota
 Wylie, Texas, a city located primarily within Collin County
 Wylie, Taylor County, Texas, an unincorporated community largely in the city limits of Abilene
 Wylie Island, a bar island on the New River in Summers County, West Virginia
 Lake Wylie, a reservoir, or man-made lake in the U.S. states of both South Carolina and North Carolina

Elsewhere
 Wylie Bay, a bay 4 nautical miles (7 km) wide, lying between Cape Monaco and Norsel Point on the southwest coast of Anvers Island, in the Palmer Archipelago, a group of islands off the northwestern coast of the Antarctic Peninsula
 Wylie Ridge, a ridge that extends westward from Meier Peak in the Admiralty Mountains, Victoria Land, Antarctica
 Wylie, Ontario, a municipality in Eastern Ontario, Canada, on the Ottawa River in Renfrew County

Other
 Wylie transliteration for Tibetan script
 Wylie House Museum a historic house museum of Indiana University's first president Andrew Wylie, in Bloomington, IN
 Lazard Carnegie Wylie, a boutique investment bank that advises in mergers and acquisitions, restructurings, initial public offerings and related transactions
 Wylie Mansion, an American mansion which once stood at 10 Thomas Circle in Washington, D.C
 Wylie School, a historic school building at Ekonk Hill Road and Wylie School Road in Voluntown, Connecticut

See also
 Wiley (disambiguation)
 Whiley
 Wily (disambiguation)
 Wylie (disambiguation)
 Wyllie
 Willey (disambiguation)
 Wylye (disambiguation)
 Wyle (disambiguation)
 Wyly
 Alexander Wylie (disambiguation)
 Andrew Wylie (disambiguation)
 John Wylie (disambiguation)
 Wylie High School (disambiguation)
 David Wylie (disambiguation)
 George Wylie (disambiguation)